Blountsville is an extinct town in Jones County, in the U.S. state of Georgia. The GNIS classifies it as a populated place.

History
The first permanent settlement at Blountsville was made before 1817. The community was named after the local Blount family. A variant name was "Blountville". A post office called Blountsville was established in 1819, and remained in operation until 1899.  After Blountsville was badly damaged in the Civil War, its population dwindled.

References

Geography of Jones County, Georgia
Ghost towns in Georgia (U.S. state)